Vilkhivka is an urban-type settlement in the Zhdanivka Municipality, Horlivka Raion of Donetsk Oblast (province) in eastern Ukraine. Population:

Demographics
Native language as of the Ukrainian Census of 2001:
 Ukrainian 19.15%
 Russian 80.85%

References

Urban-type settlements in Horlivka Raion